Django is a 2017 French drama film about the life of Django Reinhardt, directed by Étienne Comar. It opened the 67th Berlin International Film Festival. Reinhardt's music is performed in the film by the Rosenberg Trio.

Cast
Reda Kateb as Django Reinhardt
Cécile de France as Louise de Klerk 
Bea Palya as Naguine
Johnny Montreuil as Joseph Reinhardt
Raphaël Dever as Vola
Patrick Mille as Charlie Delaunay
Àlex Brendemühl as Hans Biber
Ulrich Brandhoff as Hammerstein

Reception
On review aggregator website Rotten Tomatoes, the film holds an approval rating of 61% based on 23 reviews, and an average rating of 5.5/10. On Metacritic, the film has a weighted average score of 49 out of 100, based on 13 critics, indicating "mixed or average reviews".

References

External links

2017 films
2017 directorial debut films
2017 drama films
2017 biographical drama films
French biographical drama films
Films about music and musicians
Films scored by Warren Ellis (musician)
Cultural depictions of Django Reinhardt
2010s French films